Events in chess during the year 2002:
 The Manhattan Chess Club closes.  Founded in 1877, it was the second oldest chess club in the United States.

Top players

FIDE top 10 players by Elo rating - October 2002;

Garry Kasparov  2836
Vladimir Kramnik  2809
Viswanathan Anand  2755
Michael Adams  2745
Veselin Topalov  2743
Peter Leko  2743
Ruslan Ponomariov  2743
Evgeny Bareev  2737
Alexander Morozevich  2742
Vassily Ivanchuk  2709

Tournaments

Deaths
Ricardo Calvo, a Spanish chess International Master - September 26
Eduard Gufeld, a Ukrainian International Grandmaster and chess author - September 23
Edmar Mednis, an American International Grandmaster and chess writer - February 13

References

 
21st century in chess
Chess by year